Bowman Hotel may refer to:

Bowman Hotel (Nogales, Arizona), listed on the National Register of Historic Places (NRHP) in Arizona
Bowman Hotel (Pendleton, Oregon), also NRHP-listed